ECOnetic is a tradename for certain car models produced by Ford of Europe, currently consisting of one model in each of the Fiesta, the Focus and the Mondeo range, with an emphasis on higher fuel efficiency and low-CO2 emissions.

Design philosophy
As opposed to developing hybrid vehicles like Prius, Ford of Europe took a different design philosophy: to create vehicles that are as fuel efficient as possible, without compromising driving experience. The resultant ECOnetic range focuses on improved design and refinement of existing technology, focusing on three main streams of improvement:
Aerodynamics: models have a redesigned front bumper skirt, which are more aerodynamic, and reduces drag further through use of a smaller lower grill. To the side, skirts are introduced together with hubcaps designed to improve airflow. A new and extended rear spoiler reduces rear drag
Resistance: Ford worked with Michelin to create a thinner tyre with lower rolling resistance. The engine's bearings are replaced with lower-resistance versions
Efficiency: engineers re-mapped the 1.6-litre Duratorq TDCi engine, equipped with a coated Diesel Particulate Filter (cDPF), and recalibrated the power steering system. The ECOnetic was the first Ford car to use low-friction transmission oil, which is now uniform on all 1.6-litre diesel European-produced Fords. The 2012 Focus version has a six-speed gearbox, with sixth gear an overdrive.

Models
First announced in late-2007, Ford proposed ECOnetic models in the Fiesta, Focus and Mondeo ranges. The first cars were available to order from dealers in early 2008, priced at £250 above the "Style" models. Delivered to United Kingdom from April 2008, the models was in the lowest bracket of Vehicle Excise Duty and exempt form the London Congestion Charge.

The second generation Fiesta ECOnetic was launched at the 2008 British International Motor Show. To encourage drivers to be efficient, a green upwards arrow-shaped indicator light within the dashboard's rev counter signals to the driver when to change up to a higher gear for optimum fuel efficiency and thus economy, later also introduced to the Focus model.

The 2012 Focus ECOnetic model includes: Smart Regenerative Charging to reduce alternator resistance; Auto-Start-Stop; electrically operated front grille shutter, to improve high speed aerodynamics.

North America
It is not presently planned to introduce ECOnetic models to the North American market, because, as Business Week noted, the company "doesn't believe it could charge enough to make money on an imported ECOnetic" and doesn't think it would sell enough of the model (350,000/year) to justify the $350 million in upgrades required at their Mexico plant to manufacture it.

References

External links

ECOnetic at ford.co.uk
Green vehicles
Automotive technology tradenames
Ford of Europe